Spartak Tennis Club, also known as Shiryaevka, is a tennis training ground located near Sokolniki Park in Moscow, Russia. Built in 1979, it formerly formed part of the Spartak sports society. It has 15 outdoor clay courts, which remain open for four months during the year, and two indoor courts. The club is known for training a number of top Russian tennis players who have gone on to win Grand Slam titles. Competition for places at the academy was high as of 2013 due to its rigorous training program.

Notable alumni
 Elena Dementieva
 Yevgeny Kafelnikov
 Anna Kournikova
 Anastasia Myskina
 Marat Safin (both of his parents were employees of the club)
 Dinara Safina

References

Spartak Moscow
Tennis venues in Russia
Tennis clubs